Diclidophoridae is a family of monogeneans within the order Mazocraeidea.

Genera 
Placed by WoRMS:

 Absonifibula 
 Allodiclidophora 
 Allotagia 
 Atlanticotyle 
 Bravocotyle 
 Campechia 
 Chalguacotyle 
 Choricotyle 
 Cyclobothrium 
 Cyclocotyla 
 Cyclocotyloides 
 Diclidophora 
 Diclidophoropsis 
 Dussumericola 
 Echinopelma 
 Eurysorchis 
 Flexophora 
 Gempylitrema 
 Hargicotyle 
 Helciferus 
 Hemitagia 
 Heterobothrioides 
 Heterobothrium 
 Hexocyclobothrium 
 Inbjumia 
 Keralina 
 Lampanyctophilus 
 Lebboia 
 Macrouridophora 
 Macruricotyle 
 Mamaevicotyle 
 Mamaevodiclidophora 
 Megaloncus 
 Neodiclidophora 
 Neoheterobothrium 
 Olivacotyle 
 Orbocotyle 
 Osphyobothrus 
 Papillochoricotyle 
 Paracyclocotyla 
 Paraeurysorchis 
 Paraheterobothrium 
 Parapedocotyle 
 Pedocotyle 
 Polycliphora 
 Polyipnicola 
 Pseudoeurysorchis 
 Sauricotyle 
 Teleurysorchis 
 Tribuliphorus 
 Upenicola 
 Urocotyle 
 Zeicotyle

References 

Platyhelminthes families
Diclidophoridae